is a Japanese manga series by Tobi. It was serialized in Flex Comix's Flex Comix Blood online shōnen manga magazine between 2007 and 2008, and was collected in a single tankōbon volume. It was adapted into a series of OVA in 2010.

Characters
Satomi Moriya as Kana Asō (ep 1)
Nobuhiko Okamoto as Jun'ichi Kamiya (ep 1)
Asami Imai as Aya Ichinohe (eps 1–2)
Daisuke Hirakawa as Takashi Miyaguchi (ep 2)
Saori Hayami as Mitsuki Kimura (ep 3)
Atsushi Abe as Tōru Tanaka (ep 3)
Kana Hanazawa as Chiaki Kuramoto (ep 4)
Hiro Shimono as Tatsuya Takatsuka (ep 4)

References

External links
Official website 

2000s webcomics
2007 manga
2008 webcomic endings
2010 anime OVAs
Anime International Company
FlexComix Blood and FlexComix Next manga
Japanese comedy webcomics
Romance webcomics
Shōnen manga
Webcomics in print